James Carroll Booker III (December 17, 1939 – November 8, 1983) was a New Orleans rhythm and blues keyboardist born in New Orleans, Louisiana, United States. Booker's unique style combined rhythm and blues with jazz standards. Musician Dr. John described Booker as "the best black, gay, one-eyed junkie piano genius New Orleans has ever produced." Flamboyant in personality and having an extraordinary technical facility, he was known as "the Black Liberace".

Biography

Early life
Booker was the son and grandson of Baptist ministers, both of whom played the piano. He spent most of his childhood on the Mississippi Gulf Coast, where his father was a church pastor. Booker received a saxophone as a gift from his mother when he was 10. He had wanted a trumpet, but mastered the saxophone even though it was bought by mistake. Booker's proficiency on the saxophone and piano gave him a local reputation as a child prodigy. Yet he focused on the piano and mastered Bach's Inventions and Sinfonias, performing such pieces at a professional level by the age of 12. He also played the organ in his father's churches. He aspired, however, to become a Catholic priest. He decided against this path with the idea that music would be his means of spiritual expression.

In 1949 at age 9, Booker was struck by an ambulance that he said was traveling about 70 miles an hour. According to Booker, it dragged him for 30 feet and broke his leg in eight places, nearly requiring its amputation. He was given morphine, to which he attributed to some extent his eventual drug addiction. The accident left him with a permanent limp.

Returning to New Orleans in 1953, Booker attended the Xavier University Preparatory School on Magazine Street. At Xavier he was an excellent student, especially in math, music, and Spanish, and graduated from the high school in 1957. 
He learned some elements of his keyboard style from Tuts Washington and Edward Frank, and was later influenced by Professor Longhair and Ray Charles.
Booker also mastered piano music of Chopin, Rachmaninoff, and Ernesto Lecuona (especially Malaguena which he often performed), and memorized solos by Erroll Garner and Liberace. His interpretations of jazz and popular songs combined elements of stride, blues, gospel and Latin piano styles.

1954 to 1976: Recording and touring
Booker made his recording debut in 1954 on the Imperial Records label, with "Doin' the Hambone" and "Thinkin' 'Bout My Baby", produced by Dave Bartholomew. Bartholomew also soon chose to substitute Booker on piano for Fats Domino, to combine the younger pianist's virtuosity with Domino's popular singing. Yet Booker also played many other collaborations after the Imperial recordings, as described in liner notes (by Bunny Matthews) to the album Classified. He is quoted saying he "recorded for Leonard Chess  — I did 'A Heavenly Angel' with Arthur Booker [no relation]. After that, I recorded for Johnny Vincent's Ace Records. I played with Huey Smith and Shirley and Lee. When I graduated high school, I played with Joe Tex. I left Joe Tex to play with Huey Smith." In the early 1960s, he performed on keyboard for Smiley Lewis and Lloyd Price.
 

In 1958, Arthur Rubinstein performed a concert in New Orleans. Afterwards, eighteen-year-old Booker was introduced to the concert pianist and played several pieces for him. Rubinstein was astonished, saying "I could never play that ... never at that tempo" (The Times-Picayune, 1958). During this period, Booker also became known for his flamboyant personality among his peers.

After recording a few other singles, he enrolled as an undergraduate in Southern University's music department. In 1960, Booker's "Gonzo", for Peacock Records, reached number 43 on the United States (U.S.) record chart of Billboard magazine and number 3 on the R&B record chart. Following "Gonzo", Booker released some moderately successful singles. In the 1960s, he started using illicit drugs, and in 1970 served a brief sentence in Angola Prison for drug possession. 

As Booker became more familiar to law enforcement in New Orleans due to his drug use, he formed a relationship with District Attorney Harry Connick Sr., who was occasionally Booker's legal counsel. Connick would discuss law with Booker during his visits to the Connick home and made an arrangement with the musician whereby a prison sentence would be nullified in exchange for piano lessons for Connick Sr.'s son Harry Connick Jr.

In 1973, Booker recorded The Lost Paramount Tapes at Paramount Studios in Hollywood, California, U.S. with members of the Dr. John band, which included John Boudreaux on drums, Jessie Hill on percussion, Alvin Robinson on guitar and vocals, Richard "Didymus" Washington on percussion, David Lastie on sax, and David L. Johnson on bass guitar. The album was produced by former Dr. John band member David L. Johnson and by singer/songwriter Daniel Moore. The master tapes disappeared from the Paramount Recording Studios library, but a copy of the mixes that were made around the time of the recordings was discovered in 1992, which resulted in a CD release on DJM Records.

Booker then played organ in Dr. John's Bonnaroo Revue touring band in 1974, and also appeared as a sideman on albums by Ringo Starr, John Mayall, The Doobie Brothers, Labelle and Geoff Muldaur throughout this period.

Booker's performance at the 1975 New Orleans Jazz and Heritage Festival earned a recording contract for him with Island Records. His album with Island, Junco Partner, was produced by Joe Boyd, who had previously recorded Booker on sessions for Muldaur's records. In January 1976, Booker briefly joined the Jerry Garcia Band, playing two Palo Alto, California shows where Garcia was  "backing up ... Booker on most numbers."

1976 to 1978: Success in Europe
Several concerts from Booker's 1977 and 1978  European tours were professionally recorded, and some were also filmed for television broadcast. Multiple albums were released from these recordings on a number of record labels. The album New Orleans Piano Wizard: Live!, which was recorded at his performance at the "Boogie Woogie and Ragtime Piano Contest" in Zurich, Switzerland, won the Grand Prix du Disque. He also played at the Nice and Montreux Jazz Festivals in 1978 and recorded a session for the BBC during this time. Fourteen years later, a recording entitled Let's Make A Better World!—made in Leipzig during this period—became the last record to be produced in the former East Germany.

In a 2013 interview, filmmaker Lily Keber, who directed a documentary on Booker, provided her perspective on Booker's warm reception in European nations such as Germany and France:

Well, the racism wasn't there, the homophobia wasn't there—as much. Even the drug use was a little more tolerated. But really I think that Booker felt he was being taken seriously in Europe, and it made him think of himself differently and improved the quality of his music. He needed the energy of the audience to feed off.

Keber further explained that Europeans refer to jazz as "the art of the twentieth century" and suggests that the "classical tradition" that is present in the continent led to a greater understanding of Booker among audiences. Keber states that Booker was "concert-hall worthy" to European jazz lovers.

1978 to 1983: Return to the U.S.
From 1978 to 1982, Booker was the house pianist at the Maple Leaf Bar in the Carrollton neighborhood of uptown New Orleans. Recordings during this time, made by John Parsons, were released as Spiders on the Keys and Resurrection of the Bayou Maharajah. Following his success in Europe, Booker was forced to adjust to a lower level of public recognition, as he performed in cafes and bars. Keber believes this shift was "devastating" to Booker, as he was aware of his own talent.

Booker's last commercial recording, made in 1982, was titled Classified and, according to producer Scott Billington, was completed in four hours. By this time, Booker's physical and mental condition had deteriorated. He was also subject to the social stigma that affected people who used illicit drugs and those with mental health issues during this era of American history.

At the end of October 1983, filmmaker Jim Gabour captured Booker's final concert performance for a series on the New Orleans music scene. The series, entitled Music City, was broadcast on Cox Cable and included footage from the Maple Leaf Bar in New Orleans and a six-and-a-half-minute improvisation called "Seagram's Jam."

Death
Booker died aged 43 on November 8, 1983, while seated in a wheelchair in the emergency room at New Orleans' Charity Hospital, waiting to receive medical attention. The cause of death, as cited in the Orleans Parish Coroner's Death Certificate, was renal failure related to chronic abuse of heroin and alcohol.

Posthumous tributes
Booker's death was mourned by music lovers and numerous admirers have emerged in the time since. Harry Connick Jr., Henry Butler, and Dr. John, among others, recorded songs with titles and musical styles referencing Booker. Connick Jr. explained his mentor's piano-playing style in an interview: "Nothing was harder than that. It's insane. It's insanity." and called him "the greatest ever."

Transcriptions by Joshua Paxton (with Tom McDermott and Andy Fielding) of Booker's playing are available in The James Booker Collection and New Orleans Piano Legends, both published by the Hal Leonard Corporation. Paxton explained the significance of Booker in a 2013 interview:

From a musician’s perspective or piano player’s perspective, he matters because he figured out how to do things no one had ever done before, at least in a rhythm-and-blues context.... Basically he figured out ways to do a lot of stuff at the same time and make the piano sound like an entire band. It’s Ray Charles on the level of Chopin. It’s all the soul, all the groove, and all the technique in the universe packed into one unbelievable player ... I can now say with certainty that it’s a pianistic experience unlike any other. He invented an entirely new way of playing blues and roots-based music on the piano, and it was mind-blowingly brilliant and beautiful.

The influential New Orleans musician, composer, and producer Allen Toussaint also praised Booker, applying the term "genius" to him:

There are some instances in his playing that are very unusual and highly complex, but the groove is never sacrificed. Within all the romping and stomping in his music, there were complexities in it that, if one tried to emulate it, what you heard and what excited you on the surface was supported by some extreme technical acrobatics finger-wise that made his music extraordinary as far as I’m concerned. And most of all, it always felt wonderful ... He was an extraordinary musician, both soul wise and groove wise ... He was just an amazing musician.

Booker's vocal ability is also a subject that has been covered since his death. New Orleans pianist Tom McDermott, who has also studied the work of Booker, stated that he is "so moved" by Booker's vocals, as "you could feel the desperation in a way that few singers could impart." McDermott believes that Booker's skillful combination of vocal virtuosity with a magnificent emotional power superseded the singing of Frank Sinatra.

Patchwork: A Tribute to James Booker is a 2003 release consisting of a compilation of his songs, performed by various pianists. Released in 2007, Manchester '77 consists of a live performance recorded in October 1977 at The Lake Side Hotel, Belle Vue, Manchester, UK, with the Norman Beaker Band in support for two songs. In late 2013, Rounder Records announced the forthcoming release of a double-CD deluxe version of Classified, Booker's final studio recordings.

Writing for PopMatters in 2014, George de Stefano said: "And then there’s James Booker, whose stature in New Orleans musical history can be gauged by the various nicknames bestowed on the gifted, troubled, openly gay musician: the Bayou Maharajah (the title of a new documentary film about the pianist), the Piano Pope, the Ivory Emperor, the Piano Prince of New Orleans. Booker himself coined at least one of these monikers—the Bronze Liberace."

Bayou Maharajah: The Tragic Genius of James Booker
A feature-length documentary about Booker titled Bayou Maharajah: The Tragic Genius of James Booker, directed by Lily Keber, premiered at the SXSW festival on March 14, 2013. Keber raised funds on the Kickstarter website to complete the film, as she needed to cover licensing costs to include all of the "concert footage, home movie, funky photo and unreleased audio" that she uncovered across the U.S. and Europe. Between December 2012 and January 2013, the Kickstarter campaign received US$18,323 from 271 backers—Keber's goal was US$15,000—who responded to the director's motivation: "After so many years of simmering in obscurity, it's time for James Booker to be introduced to the world!"

The film documents Booker's life, from his Baptist upbringing through to his solitary death at Charity Hospital. In addition to coverage of Booker's significant influence upon Connick and his collaborations with prominent artists, Keber also documents the musician's heroin use and the deterioration in his mental health. In its review of the documentary, All About Jazz refers to Booker as a "jazz genius". Worldwide distribution of the film was undertaken by Cadiz music on August 6, 2016. As of September 1, 2016 the film is available for streaming on Amazon.com and Netflix. The DVD was released on October 14, 2016, in Europe and North America.

Keber's film was shown in May 2013—in the "Golden Rock Documentary" category—at the Little Rock Film Festival that is held annually on the banks of the Arkansas River in Little Rock, Arkansas. The Oxford American magazine bestowed the 2013 Best Southern Film Award to Keber at the Little Rock festival and praised the film as "one of the most culturally important documentaries made in recent years". Keber explained her introduction to Booker in a subsequent Oxford American interview:

When I played Booker's album, the first thing that I noticed was what bizarre song titles it had—stuff like "Coquette" and "Piano Salad." I didn't know what "piano salad" meant. I had no idea what to make of the music either. I know how to listen to something like the Neville Brothers or Irma Thomas, but Booker's music I didn't even know how to listen to. It was like a different language.

In June and August 2013, the film was part of the program of the Melbourne International Film Festival (MIFF) and producer Nathaniel Kohn attended as a representative. Kohn participated in a brief interview and explained the importance of the research process:

Research was key to discovering Booker and his music. He died in 1983 and many of the people who knew him are either dead or reaching that certain age when memories start to fade. So we talked to a lot of people and those conversations led to boxes of old photographs and tapes, video and music libraries in the States and in Europe, and the vaults of television stations, record companies, and museums. Over three years of research went into this production.

Keber's documentary was also the opening night film at the Southern Screen Film Festival in Lafayette, Louisiana on November 14, 2013. A question and answer (Q&A) session with Keber followed the screening.

Discography

Singles
 1954, "Doin' the Hambone"/"Thinkin' 'Bout My Baby", Imperial Records
 1958, "Open the Door/Teenage Rock", Ace Records: 547 (as Little Booker)
 1960, "Gonzo", Peacock Records: , FR1061

Studio albums
 Lost Paramount Tapes (DJM, 1974)
 Junco Partner (Hannibal, 1976)
 Classified (Demon, 1982)

Live albums
 The Piano Prince Of New Orleans (Black Sun Music, 1976)
 Blues And Ragtime From New Orleans (Aves, 1976)
 James Booker Live! (Gold, 1978)
 New Orleans Piano Wizard: Live! (Rounder, 1987)
 Resurrection Of The Bayou Maharajah (Rounder, 1993)
 Spiders On The Keys (Rounder, 1993)
 Live At Montreux (Montreux Sounds, 1997)
 United Our Thing Will Stand (Night Train International, 2000)
 A Taste Of Honey (Night Train International, 2006)
 Manchester '77 (Document, 2007)
 Live From Belle Vue (Suncoast Music, 2015)
 At Onkel Pö's Carnegie Hall Hamburg 1976 Vol. 1 (Jazz Line, 2019)
 True - Live at Tipitina's - 04/25/78 (Tipitina's Records, 2021)

Compilations
 King Of New Orleans Keyboard Vol. 1-2 (JSP, 1984–85)
 Mr. Mystery (Sundown, 1984)
 Let's Make A Better World (Amiga, 1991)
 The Lost Paramount Tapes (DJM, 1995)
 More Than All The 45s (Night Train International, 1996)
 New Orleans Keyboard King (Orbis, 1996)

(Albums listed are with James Booker as main artist. For a complete discography which includes Booker's other album credits, see "External Links".)

See also
1970s in jazz
Drug use in songs
Genius
Jazz piano
Music of New Orleans
Piano history and musical performance

References

External links
 "Booker's Mad Muse", April 23, 2006 at the San Francisco Chronicle
 "Booker: A Pianist's Perspective", by Joshua Paxton
 "Making The Insipid Sublime", January 17, 2007 at NPR
 "Maharajahs in the Mist" from Blues Access Summer, 1997
 Producer Scott Billington on Booker
 Singer Rickie Lee Jones on Booker
 Illustrated James Booker Discography
 Jerry Garcia & James Booker Sessions Info
 Harriet Blum's Original Booker Photos
 Document Records James Booker Podcast
 James Carroll Booker III
 Bayou Maharajah: The troubled genius of James Booker (documentary film)
 "Reviving James Booker, The 'Piano Prince Of New Orleans'", March 31, 2012 at NPR

1939 births
1983 deaths
African-American jazz pianists
African-American pianists
American blues singers
American blues pianists
American male pianists
Boogie-woogie pianists
Deaths from kidney failure
LGBT African Americans
Rhythm and blues musicians from New Orleans
Jazz musicians from New Orleans
Blues musicians from New Orleans
Rhythm and blues pianists
Stride pianists
American gay musicians
LGBT people from Louisiana
20th-century American singers
20th-century American pianists
Singers from Louisiana
American male organists
20th-century African-American male singers
American jazz pianists
American rhythm and blues singers
American rhythm and blues keyboardists
20th-century organists
20th-century American male singers
American male jazz musicians
Jerry Garcia Band members
Drug-related deaths in Louisiana
Alcohol-related deaths in Louisiana
20th-century American keyboardists
20th-century American LGBT people
American organists